Pablo Luna Gamio (born 15 April 1958) is a Mexican former footballer and currently manager of Alacranes de Durango in Liga de Ascenso.

Career
Luna played in the Primera División de México for UNAM Pumas, Club Necaxa, Atlético Potosino and Cobras de Ciudad Juárez.

In May 2010, according to the Governor of Durango, the head coach of Alacranes de Durango would be Pablo Luna, with whom they hope to return to the playoffs after a couple of seasons in which Durango has not yet accomplished anything important in soccer promotion (Liga de Ascenso).

References

External links

1958 births
Living people
Footballers from Mexico City
Mexican footballers
Club Universidad Nacional footballers
Club Necaxa footballers
San Luis F.C. players
Mexican football managers
Club Universidad Nacional managers
Deportivo Toluca F.C. managers
Club Necaxa managers
Association footballers not categorized by position